Vladivostok is the largest city and the administrative center of Primorsky Krai, Russia. Vladivostok is the second-largest city in the Far Eastern Federal District, as well as the Russian Far East, after Khabarovsk.

Shortly after the signing of the Treaty of Aigun, the city was founded on July 2, 1860 as a Russian military outpost on formerly Chinese land. In 1872, the main Russian naval base on the Pacific Ocean was transferred to the city, stimulating the growth of the young city. After the outbreak of the Russian Revolution in 1917, Vladivostok was occupied in 1918 by White Russian and Allied forces, the last of whom from Japan were not withdrawn until 1922; by that time the antirevolutionary White Army forces in Vladivostok promptly collapsed, and Soviet power was established in the city. After the dissolution of the Soviet Union, Vladivostok became the administrative center of Primorsky Krai.

Vladivostok is the largest Russian port on the Pacific Ocean, and the chief cultural, economic, scientific, and tourism heart of the Russian Far East. As the terminus of the Trans-Siberian Railway, the city was visited by over three million tourists in 2017. The city is the administrative center of the Far Eastern Federal District, and is the home to the headquarters of the Pacific Fleet of the Russian Navy. Due to its geographical position, and its Russian culture, the city has been referred to as "Europe in the Far East". Many foreign consulates and businesses have offices in Vladivostok, and the city hosts the annual Eastern Economic Forum. With a yearly mean temperature of around  Vladivostok has a cold climate for its mid-latitude coastal setting. This is due to winds from the vast Eurasian landmass in winter, also cooling the ocean temperatures.

Names and etymology

Vladivostok means 'Lord of the East' or 'Ruler of the East'. The name derives from Slavic  ('to rule') and Russian  ('east'); see the etymology of Vladimir (name). Colloquial Russian speech may use the short form Vladik to refer to the city.

The city, along with other features in the Peter the Great Gulf area, was first given its modern name in 1859 by Nikolay Muravyov-Amursky. The form of the name appears analogous to that of the city of Vladikavkaz ("Ruler of the Caucasus" or "Rule the Caucasus"), now in North Ossetia–Alania, which was founded and named by the Russian Empire in 1784.

In China, Vladivostok is now officially known by the transliteration ), although the historical Chinese name  is still often used in common parlance and outside Mainland China to refer to the city. According to the provisions of the Chinese government, all maps published in China must bracket the city's Chinese name.

History

Foundation 

For a long time, the Russian government was looking for a stronghold in the Far East; this role was played in turn by the settlements of Okhotsk, Ayan, Petropavlovsk-Kamchatsky, and Nikolaevsk-on-Amur. By the middle of the 19th century, the search for the outpost had reached a dead end: none of the ports met the necessary requirement: to have a convenient and protected harbor next to important trade routes. After China was threatened with war on a second front by Governor-General of the Far East Nikolay Muraviev when China was suppressing the Taiping Rebellion,
the Aigun Treaty was concluded by  Muraviev's forces, after which Russian exploration of the Amur region began, and later, as a result of the signing of the Treaty of Tientsin and the Convention of Peking, the territory of modern Vladivostok was annexed to Russia. The name Vladivostok appeared in the middle of 1859, was used in newspaper articles and denoted a bay. On June 20 (or July 2 of the Gregorian calendar), 1860 the transport of the Siberian Military Flotilla "Mandzhur" under the command of Lieutenant-Commander Alexei Karlovich Shefner delivered a military unit to the Golden Horn Bay to establish a military post, which has now officially received the name of Vladivostok.

19th century – early 20th century 
On October 31, 1861, the first civilian settler, a merchant, Yakov Lazarevich Semyonov, arrived in Vladivostok with his family. On March 15, 1862, the first act of his purchase of land was registered, and in 1870 Semyonov was elected the first head of the post, and a local self-government emerged. By this time, a special commission decided to designate Vladivostok as the main port of the Russian Empire in the Far East. In 1871, the main naval base of the Siberian Military Flotilla, the headquarters of the military governor and other naval departments were transferred from Nikolaevsk-on-Amur to Vladivostok.

In the 1870s, the government encouraged resettlement to the South Ussuri region, which contributed to an increase in the population of the post: according to the first census of 1878, there were 4,163 inhabitants. The city status was adopted and the city Duma was established, the post of the city head, the coat of arms was adopted, although Vladivostok was not officially recognized as a city.

Due to the constant threat of attack from the Royal Navy, Vladivostok also actively developed as a naval base.

In 1880, the post officially received the status of a city. The 1890s saw a demographic and economic boom associated with the completion of the construction of the Ussuriyskaya branch of the Trans-Siberian Railway and the Chinese-Eastern Railway. According to the first census of the population of Russia on 9 February 1897, roughly 29,000 inhabitants lived in Vladivostok, and ten years later the city's population tripled.

The first decade of the 20th century was characterized by a protracted crisis caused by the political situation: the government's attention was shifted to Lüshunkou and the Port of Dalian (Talien). As well as the Boxer uprising in North China in 1900–1901, the Russo-Japanese War of 1904–1905, and finally the first Russian revolution led to stagnation in the economic activity of Vladivostok.

Since 1907, a new stage in the development of the city began: the losses of Lüshunkou and Dalian (Talien) again made Vladivostok the main port of Russia on the Pacific Ocean. A free port regime was introduced, and until 1914 the city experienced rapid growth, becoming an important economic hub in the Asia-Pacific, as well as an ethnically diverse city with a population exceeding over 100,000 inhabitants: during the time ethnic Russians made up less than half of the population, and large Asian communities developed in the city. The public life of the city flourished; many public associations were created, from charities to hobby groups.

World War I, Revolution and Occupation 

During World War I, no active hostilities took place in the city. However, Vladivostok was an important staging post for the import of military-technical equipment for troops from allied and neutral countries, as well as raw materials and equipment for industry.

Immediately after the October Revolution in 1917, during which the Bolsheviks came to power, the Decree on Peace was announced, and as a result of the Treaty of Brest-Litovsk concluded between the Bolshevik government of Russia and the Central Powers, led to the end of Soviet Russia's participation in World War I. On October 30, the sailors of the Siberian Military Flotilla decided to "rally around the united power of the Soviets", and the power of Vladivostok, as well as all of the Trans-Siberian Railway passed to the Bolsheviks. During the Russian Civil War, from May 1918, they lost control of the city to the White Army-allied Czechoslovak Legion, who declared the city to be an Allied protectorate. Vladivostok became the staging point for the Allies' Siberian intervention, a multi-national force including Japan, the United States and China; China sent forces to protect the local Chinese community after appeals from Chinese merchants. The intervention ended in the wake of the collapse of the White Army and regime in 1919; all Allied forces except the Japanese withdrew by the end of 1920.

Throughout 1919 the region was engulfed in a partisan war. To avoid a war with Japan, with the filing of the Soviet leadership, the Far Eastern Republic, a Soviet-backed buffer state between Soviet Russia and Japan, was proclaimed on 6 April 1920. The Soviet government officially recognized the new republic in May, but in Primorye a riot occurred, where significant forces of the White Movement were located, leading to the creation of the Provisional Priamurye Government, with Vladivostok as its capital.

In October 1922, the troops of the Red Army of the Far Eastern Republic under the command of Ieronim Uborevich occupied Vladivostok, displacing the White Army formations from it. In November, the Far Eastern Republic liquidated and became a part of Soviet Russia.

Soviet period 
By the time of the establishment of Soviet power, Vladivostok was clearly in decline. The retreating forces of the Japanese army removed items of material value from the city. Life was paralyzed; there was no money in the banks, and the equipment of enterprise was plundered. Due to mass migration and repression, the city's population decreased to 106,000 inhabitants. Between 1923 and 1925, the government adopted a "three-year restoration" plan, during which operations at the commercial port were resumed, and it became the most profitable in the country (from 1924 to 1925). The "restoration" period was distinguished by a number of peculiarities: the Russian Far East did not adopt 'war communism', but was, immediately, inducted to the New Economic Policy.

In 1925, the government decided to accelerate the industrialization of the country. A number of subsequent "five-year plans" changed the face of Primorye, making it an industrial region, partly as a result of the creation of numerous concentration camps in the region. In the 1930s and 1940s, Vladivostok served as a transit point on the route used to deliver prisoners and cargo for the Sevvostlag of the Soviet super-trust Dalstroy. The notorious Vladivostok transit camp was located in the city. In addition, in the late 1930s and early 1940s, the Vladivostok forced labour camp (Vladlag) was located in the area of the Vtoraya Rechka railway station.

Vladivostok was not a place of hostilities during the Great Patriotic War, although there was a constant threat of attack from Japan. In the city, a "Defense Fund" was created (the first in the country), to which the residents of Vladivostok contributed personal wealth. During the war years Vladivostok handled imported cargo (lend-lease) of a volume almost four times more than Murmansk and almost five times more than Arkhangelsk.

By the decree of the Council of Ministers of the Soviet Union "Issues of the Fifth Navy" dated August 11, 1951, a special regime was introduced in Vladivostok (it began to operate on January 1, 1952); the city was closed to foreigners. It was planned to remove from Vladivostok not only foreign consulates, but also the merchant and fish fleet and transfer all regional authorities to Voroshilov (now Ussuriysk). However, these plans were not implemented.

During the years of the Khrushchev Thaw, Vladivostok received special attention from state authorities. In 1954, Nikita Khrushchev visited the city for the first time to finally decide whether to secure the status of a closed naval base for him. It was noted that at that time the urban infrastructure was in a deplorable state. In 1959, Khrushchev visited the city again. The result is a decision on the accelerated development of the city, which was formalized by the decree of the Council of Ministers of the Soviet Union on 18 January 1960. During the 1960s, a new tram line was built, a trolleybus was launched, the city became a huge construction site: residential neighborhoods were being erected on the outskirts, and new buildings for public and civil purposes were erected in the center.

In 1974, Gerald Ford paid an official visit to Vladivostok, to meet with Leonid Brezhnev, becoming the first President of the United States to visit the Soviet Union.

On September 20, 1991, Boris Yeltsin signed decree No. 123 "On the opening of Vladivostok for visiting by foreign citizens", which entered into force on January 1, 1992, ending Vladivostok's status as a closed city.

Modern period 
In 2012, Vladivostok hosted the 24th APEC summit. Leaders from the APEC member countries met at Russky Island, off the coast of Vladivostok. With the summit on Russky Island, the government and private businesses inaugurated resorts, dinner and entertainment facilities, in addition to the renovation and upgrading of Vladivostok International Airport. Two giant cable-stayed bridges were built in preparation for the summit, the Zolotoy Rog bridge over the Zolotoy Rog Bay in the center of the city, and the Russky Island Bridge from the mainland to Russky Island (the longest cable-stayed bridge in the world). The new campus of Far Eastern Federal University was completed on Russky Island in 2012.

In December 2018 the seat of the Far Eastern Federal District, established in May 2000, was moved from Khabarovsk to Vladivostok.

Geography

Located in the extreme southeast of the Russian Far East, in the extreme southeast of North Asia, Vladivostok is geographically closer to Anchorage, Alaska, US and even Darwin, Australia than it is to the nation's capital of Moscow. Vladivostok is also closer to Honolulu, Hawaii, US than to the city of Sochi in Southern Russia. It also is further east than any area south of it in China and the entire Korean peninsula.

Climate
Vladivostok has a monsoon-influenced humid continental climate (Köppen climate classification Dwb) with warm, humid and rainy summers and cold, dry winters. Since the maritime influence is strong in summer, Vladivostok has a relatively cold annual climate for its latitude.

In winter, temperatures can drop below  while mild spells of weather can raise daytime temperatures above freezing. Snow is common during winter, but individual snowfalls are light, with a maximum snow depth of only  in January. During winter, clear sunny days are common.

Summers are warm, humid and rainy, due to the East Asian monsoon. Vladivostok receives most of its precipitation during the summer months, and most summer days see some rainfall. Cloudy days are fairly common and because of the frequent rainfall, humidity is high, on average about 90% from June to August.

During the summer season, the city is prone to typhoons and tropical storms. Typhoon Sanba struck the city as a tropical storm. Preliminary losses over the region were estimated to be ₽40 million (US$1.29 million). Typhoons can be rare, but tropical storms happen from the Sea of Japan after a typhoon landfall from South Korea and Japan.

The winter months from December to March are dry, and in some years they have seen no measurable precipitation at all.

Politics

The structure of the city administration has the City Council at the top.

The responsibilities of the administration of Vladivostok are:

Exercise of the powers to address local issues of Vladivostok in accordance with federal laws, normative legal acts of the Duma of Vladivostok, decrees and orders of the head of the city of Vladivostok;
The development and organization of the concepts, plans and programs for the development of the city, approved by the Duma of Vladivostok;
Development of the draft budget of the city;
Ensuring implementation of the budget;
The use of territory and infrastructure of the city;
Possession, use and disposal of municipal property in the manner specified by decision of the Duma of Vladivostok

Legislative authority is vested in the City Council. The new City Council began operations in 2001 and in June that year, deputies of the Duma of the first convocation of Vladivostok began their work. On 17 December 2007, the Duma of the third convocation began. The deputies consist of 35 elected members, including 18 members chosen by a single constituency, and 17 deputies from single-seat constituencies.

Administrative and municipal status

Vladivostok is the administrative center of the krai. Within the framework of administrative divisions, it is, together with five rural localities, incorporated as Vladivostok City Under Krai Jurisdiction; an administrative unit equal to that of the districts in status. As a municipal division, Vladivostok City Under Krai Jurisdiction is incorporated as Vladivostoksky Urban Okrug.

Administrative divisions 

Vladivostok is divided into five administrative districts:
 Leninsky
 Pervomaisky
 Pervorechensky
 Sovietsky
 Frunzensky

Local government 

The city charter approved the following structure of local government bodies:

City Duma is a representative body
The head of the city is its highest official
Administration is the executive and administrative body
Chamber of Control and Accounts – controls the body

Vladivostok City Duma's history dates from November 21, 1875, when 30 "vowels" were elected. Great changes took place after the 1917 Revolution, when the first general elections were held and women were allowed to vote. The last meeting of the Vladivostok City Duma took place on October 19, 1922, and on October 27 it was officially abolished. In Soviet times, its functions were performed by the City Council. In 1993, by a presidential decree, the Soviets were dissolved and, until 2001, all attempts to elect a new Duma were unsuccessful. The Duma of the city of Vladivostok of the fifth (current) convocation began work in the fall of 2017, consisting of 35 deputies.

The head of Vladivostok, on the principles of one-man management, manages the city's administration, which he forms in accordance with federal laws, laws of the Primorsky Territory and the city charter. The city's administrative structure is approved by the City Duma on the proposal of the head, and may include sectoral (functional) and territorial bodies of the administration of Vladivostok.

Igor Pushkaryov was the city's mayor from May 2008 to June 2016; previously he was a Federation Council member of Primorsky Krai. On June 27, 2016, Konstantin Loboda, the first deputy mayor, was appointed as the Vladivostok's new acting mayor. On December 21, 2017, Vitaly Vasilyevich Verkeenko was appointed the head of the city.

Demographics

Population, dynamics, age and gender structure 

According to the Russian Census of 2010, Vladivostok had a population of over 592,000, with over 616,800 residents in the greater urban area. The Primorsky State Statistics Service reported that for 2016, the total permanent population of the city's urban agglomeration was over 633,167. Since the city's founding its population has actively grown, save for the periods of the Russian Civil War and the demographic crisis after dissolution of the Soviet Union in the 1990s and the beginning of the 2000s. In the 1970s, the population exceeded over 500,000, and in 1992 reached a historical high of over 648,000. The average population density is about 1,832 people/km2.

In recent years, the population gradually has grown through migration and a rise in the birth rate. In the past five years the population has risen by 30,000. Since 2013, natural growth dynamics added 727 individuals to this figure by 2015's end. By 2020,  Vladivostok's population reached over 600,000, as reported by the Russian Federal Statistics Bureau.

The city's age distribution includes a large segment of older adults. Overall, the population includes 12.7% who are younger than able-bodied; 66.3% who are able-bodied; and 21% who are older than able-bodied. Vladivostok's population, like that of Russia as a whole, includes a significantly greater number of women over men.

Ethnic composition 
According to the Russian census of 2010, Vladivostok's residents include representatives of over seventy nationalities and ethnic groups. Among them, the largest ethnic groups (over 1,000 people) are: ethnic Russians (475,200); Ukrainians (10,474); Uzbeks (7,109); Koreans (4,192); Chinese (2,446); Tatars (2,446); Belarusians (1,642); Armenians (1,635); and Azerbaijanis (1,252).

Studies indicate that since 2002 the city's ethnic composition has changed through migration: the share of Uzbeks increased by 14.4 times; the share of Chinese and Tajiks by 5.4 times, the share of Kyrgyz by 8.5 times, and the share of by Koreans by 1.6 times. Over half of the Primorsky Territory's Koreans live compactly in two cities, Vladivostok and Ussuriysk. Over 80% of Primorye Uzbeks live in Vladivostok. Meanwhile, the proportion of Ukrainians, Belarusians, Russians, and Tatars in the city has declined.

Vladivostok is regarded as an ethnically diverse city, and remains one of the Russian cities with a large East Asian population. However, today Vladivostok lacks the same multinational diversity it had from the 19th century to the Great Patriotic War, when entire ethnic quarters existed, including the Chinese Millionka, the Korean Slobodka, and the Japanese quarter of Nihonzin Mati. Historical German, French, Estonian, American, and Central Asian diasporas at the start of the 21st century have been little studied.

Economy
The city's main industries are shipping, commercial fishing, and the naval base. Fishing accounts for almost four-fifths of Vladivostok's commercial production. Other food production totals 11%.

A very important employer and a major source of revenue for the city's inhabitants is the import of Japanese cars. Besides salesmen, the industry employs repairmen, fitters, import clerks as well as shipping and railway companies. The Vladivostok dealers sell 250,000 cars a year, with 200,000 going to other parts of Russia. Every third worker in the Primorsky Krai has some relation to the automobile import business. In recent years, the Russian government has made attempts to improve the country's own car industry. This has included raising tariffs for imported cars, which has put the car import business in Vladivostok in difficulties. To compensate, Prime Minister Vladimir Putin ordered the car manufacturing company Sollers to move one of its factories from Moscow to Vladivostok. The move was completed in 2009, and the factory now employs about 700 locals. It is planned to produce 13,200 cars in Vladivostok in 2010.

Seaport

Vladivostok is a link between the Trans-Siberian Railway and the Pacific Sea routes, making it an important cargo and passenger port. It processes both cabotage and export-import general cargo of a wide range. 20 stevedoring companies operate in the port. The cargo turnover of the Vladivostok port, including the total turnover of all stevedoring companies, at the end of 2018 amounted to 21.2 million tons.

In 2015, the total volume of external trade seaport amounted to more than 11.8 billion dollars. Foreign economic activity was carried out with 104 countries.

Tourism 

Vladivostok is located in the extreme southeast of the Russian Far East, and is the closest city to the countries of the Asia-Pacific with an exotic European culture, which makes it attractive to tourists. The city is included in the project for the development of the Far East tourism "Eastern Ring". Within the framework of the project, the Primorsky Stage of the Mariinsky Theater was opened, and there are plans to open branches of the Hermitage Museum, the Russian Museum, the Tretyakov Gallery and the State Museum of Oriental Art. Vladivostok entered the top ten Russian cities for recreation and tourism according to Forbes, and also took the fourteenth place in the National Tourism Rating.

In addition to being a cultural hub, the city also is a tourism hub in the Peter the Great Gulf. The city's resort area is located on the coast of Amur Bay, which includes over 11 sanatoriums. Vladivostok also has a bustling gambling zone, which has over 11 casinos planned to open by 2023. Tigre de Cristal, the city's first casino, was visited by over 80,000 tourists, in less than a year of its opening.

In 2017, the city was visited by around 3,000,000 tourists, including 640,000 foreigners, of which over 90% are tourists from Asia, specifically China, South Korea and Japan. Domestic tourism is based on business tourism (business trips to exhibitions, conferences), which accounts for up to 70% of the inbound flow. In Vladivostok, diplomatic tourism is also developed, as there are 18 foreign consulates in the city. There are 46 hotels in the city, with a total fund of 2561 rooms. The vast majority of the travel companies of Primorsky Krai (86%) are concentrated in Vladivostok, and their number was around 233 companies in 2011.

Transportation

The Trans-Siberian Railway was built to connect European Russia with Vladivostok, Russia's most important Pacific Ocean port. Finished in 1905, the rail line ran from Moscow to Vladivostok via several of Russia's main cities. Part of the railway, known as the Chinese Eastern Line, crossed over into China, passing through Harbin, a major city in Manchuria. Today, Vladivostok serves as the main starting point for the Trans-Siberian portion of the Eurasian Land Bridge.Vladivostok is the main air hub in the Russian Far East. Vladivostok International Airport (VVO) is the home base of Aurora, a subsidiary of Aeroflot. The airline was formed by Aeroflot in 2013 by amalgamating SAT Airlines and Vladivostok Avia. The Vladivostok International Airport was significantly upgraded in 2013 with a new -long runway capable of accommodating all aircraft types without any restrictions. The Terminal A was built in 2012 with a capacity of 3.5 million passengers per year.
International flights connect Vladivostok with
Japan, China, Philippines, North Korea, South Korea and Vietnam.

It is possible to get to Vladivostok from several of the larger cities in Russia. Regular flights to Seattle, Washington, were available in the 1990s but have been cancelled since. Vladivostok Air was flying to Anchorage, Alaska, from July 2008 to 2013, before its transformation into Aurora airline.Vladivostok is the starting point of Ussuri Highway (M60) to Khabarovsk, the easternmost part of Trans-Siberian Highway that goes all the way to Moscow and Saint Petersburg via Novosibirsk.  The other main highways go east to Nakhodka and south to Khasan.

Urban transportation
On June 28, 1908, Vladivostok's first tram line was started along Svetlanskaya Street, running from the railway station on Lugovaya Street.  On 9 October 1912, the first wooden carriages manufactured in Belgium entered service. Today, Vladivostok's means of public transportation include trolleybus, bus, tram, train, funicular and ferryboat. The main urban traffic lines are Downtown—Vtoraya Rechka, Downtown—Pervaya Rechka—3ya Rabochaya—Balyayeva, and Downtown—Lugovaya Street.

In 2012, Vladivostok hosted the 24th Summit of the Asia-Pacific Economic Cooperation (APEC) forum. In preparation for the event, the infrastructure of the city was renovated and improved. Two giant cable-stayed bridges were constructed in Vladivostok, namely the Zolotoy Rog Bridge over Golden Horn Bay, and the Russky Bridge from the mainland to Russky Island, where the summit took place. The latter bridge is the longest cable-stayed bridge in the world.

Education

There are 114 general education institutions in Vladivostok, with a total number of students of 50,700 people (in 2015). The municipal education system of the city consists of preschool organizations, primary, basic, secondary general education schools, lyceums, gymnasiums, schools with an in-depth study of individual subjects, and centers of additional education.

The municipal educational network includes 2 gymnasiums, 2 lyceums, 13 schools with advanced study of individual subjects, one primary school, 2 basic schools, 58 secondary schools, four evening schools, and one boarding school. Three Vladivostok schools are included in the Top-500 schools of the Russian Federation. At the municipal level, there is a city system of school olympiads, a city scholarship has been established for outstanding achievements of students.

In 2016, branches of the Academy of Russian Ballet and the Nakhimov Naval School were opened.

Dozens of colleges, schools and universities provide vocational education in Vladivostok. The beginning of higher education was laid in the city with the founding of the Oriental Institute. At the moment, the largest university in Vladivostok is the Far Eastern Federal University. More than 41,000 students study in it, 5,000 employees work, including 1,598 teachers. It accounts for a large share (64%) of scientific publications among Far Eastern universities.

Also, higher education in the city is represented by such local universities:
Far Eastern Federal University
Vladivostok State University of Economics and Service
Vladivostok State Medical University
Maritime State University
Far Eastern State Institute of Arts 
Far Eastern State Technical Fisheries University 
Pacific Higher Naval School and Pacific State Medical University
Branches of the Russian Customs Academy 
The International Institute of Economics and Law
Far Eastern Law Institute of the Ministry of Internal Affairs of Russia
Saint Petersburg University of the State Fire Service of the Ministry of Emergencies of Russia

Media
Over fifty newspapers and regional editions to Moscow publications are issued in Vladivostok. The largest newspaper of the Primorsky Krai and the whole Russian Far East is Vladivostok News with a circulation of 124,000 copies at the beginning of 1996. Its founder, joint-stock company Vladivostok-News, also issues a weekly English-language newspaper Vladivostok News. The subjects of the publications issued in these newspapers vary from information about Vladivostok and Primorye to major international events. Newspaper Zolotoy Rog (Golden Horn) gives every detail of economic news. Entertainment materials and cultural news constitute a larger part of Novosti (News) newspaper which is the most popular among Primorye's young people. Also, new online mass media about the Russian Far East for foreigners is the Far East Times. This source invites readers to take part in the informational support of R.F.E. for visitors, travellers and businessmen.
Vladivostok operates many online news agencies, such as NewsVL.ru, Primamedia, Primorye24 and Vesti-Primorye. From 2012 to 2017 there operates youth online magazine Vladivostok-3000.

As of 2020, there operate nineteen radio stations, including three 24-hour local stations. Radio VBC (FM 101,7 MHz, since 1993) broadcasts classic and modern rock music, oldies and music of the 1980s–1990s. Radio Lemma (FM 102,7 MHz, since 1996) broadcasts news, radio shows and various Russian and European-American songs. Vladivostok FM (FM 106,4 MHz, was launched in 2008) broadcasts local news and popular music (Top 40). The State broadcasting company "Vladivostok" broadcasts local news and music programs from 7 to 9, from 12 to 14 and from 18 to 19 on weekdays on the frequency of Radio Rossii (Radio of Russia).

Culture

Theaters

Maxim Gorky Academic Theater, named after the Russian author Maxim Gorky, was founded in 1931 and is used for drama, musical and children's theater performances.

There are five professional theaters in the city. In 2014, they were visited by 369,800 spectators. The Primorsky Regional Academic Drama Theater named after Maxim Gorky is the oldest state theater in Vladivostok, opened on 3 November 1932. The theater employs 202 people: 41 actors (of them, three folk and nine honored artists of Russia).

The Primorsky Pushkin Theater was built in 1907–1908, and is currently one of the main cultural centers of the city. In the 1930s–40s, the following still operating ones were successively opened: the Drama Theater of the Pacific Fleet, the Primorsky Regional Puppet Theater, and the Primorsky Regional Drama Theater of Youth. The regional puppet theater gave 484 performances in 2015, which were attended by more than 52,000 spectators. There are 500 puppets in the theater, where 15  artists work. The troupe regularly goes on tour to Europe and Asia.

In September 2012, a granite statue of the actor Yul Brynner (1920–1985) was inaugurated in Yul Brynner Park, directly in front of the house where he was born at 15 Aleutskaya St.

Music, opera and ballet
The city is home to the Vladivostok Pops Orchestra.

Russian rock band Mumiy Troll hails from Vladivostok and frequently puts on shows there. In addition, the city hosted the "VladiROCKstok" International Music Festival in September 1996. Hosted by the mayor and governor, and organized by two young American expatriates, the festival drew nearly 10,000 people and top-tier musical acts from St. Petersburg (Akvarium and DDT) and Seattle (Supersuckers, Goodness), as well as several leading local bands. 

Nowadays there is another annual music festival in Vladivostok, Vladivostok Rocks International Music Festival and Conference (V-ROX). Vladivostok Rocks is a three-day open-air city festival and international conference for the music industry and contemporary cultural management. It offers the opportunity for aspiring artists and producers to gain exposure to new audiences and leading international professionals.

Musical theater in Vladivostok is represented by the Primorsky Regional Philharmonic Society, the largest concert organization in Primorsky Krai. The Philharmonic has organized the Pacific Symphony Orchestra and the Governor's Brass Orchestra. In 2013, the Primorsky Opera and Ballet Theater was opened. On January 1, 2016, it was transformed into a branch of the Mariinsky Theater. The Russian Opera House houses the State Primorsky Opera and Ballet Theater.

Museums 

The Vladimir K. Arseniev Museum of Far East History, opened in 1890, is the main museum of Primorsky Krai. Besides the main facility, it has three branches in Vladivostok itself (including Arsenyev's Memorial House), and five branches elsewhere in the state. Among the items in the museum's collection are the famous 15th-century Yongning Temple Steles from the lower Amur.

Galleries and showrooms 

The active development of art museums in Vladivostok began in the 1950s. In 1960, the House of Artists was built, in which there were exhibition halls. In 1965, the Primorsky State Art Gallery was separated into a separate institution, and later, on the basis of its collection, the Children's Art Gallery was created. In Soviet times, one of the largest areas for exhibitions in Vladivostok was the exhibition hall of the Primorsky branch of the Union of Artists of Soviet Russia. In 1989 the gallery of contemporary art "Artetage" was opened.

In 1995, the Arka gallery of contemporary art was opened, the first exposition of which consisted of 100 paintings donated by the collector Alexander Glezer. The gallery participates in international exhibitions and fairs. In 2005, a non-commercial private gallery "Roytau" appeared. In recent years, the centers of contemporary art "Salt" (created on the basis of the FEFU art museum) and "Zarya", have been active.

Movie theaters 
In 2014, 21 movie theaters operated in Vladivostok, and the total number of film screenings was 1,501,000.

Most of the city's movie theaters  – Ocean, Galaktika, Moscow (formerly called New Wave movie theater), Neptune 3D (formerly called Neptune and Borodino), Illusion, Vladivostok – are renovated movie theaters s built in the Soviet years. Among them stands out "Ocean" with the largest (22 by 10 meters) screen in the Far East of the country, located in the city's downtown in the area of Sports Harbor. Together with the  "Ussuri" movie theater, it is the venue for the annual international film festival "Pacific Meridians" (since 2002). Since December 2014 the IMAX 3D hall has been operating in the Ocean movie theater.

Parks and squares

Parks and squares in Vladivostok include Pokrovskiy Park, Minnyy Gorodok, Detskiy Razvlekatelnyy Park, Park of Sergeya Lazo, Admiralskiy Skver, Skver im. Neveskogo, Nagornyy Park, Skver im. Sukhanova, Fantaziya Park, Skver Rybatskoy Slavy, Skver im. A.I.Shchetininoy.

Pokrovskiy Park
Pokrovskiy Park was once a cemetery. Converted into a park in 1934 but was closed in 1990.  Since 1990 the land the park sits on belongs to the Russian Orthodox Church.  During the rebuilding of the Orthodox Church, graves were found.

Minny Gorodok
Minny Gorodok is a  public park. Minny Gorodok means "Mine Borough Park" in English. The park is a former military base that was founded in 1880. The military base was used for storing mines in underground storage. Converted into a park in 1985, Minny Gorodok contains several lakes, ponds, and an ice-skating rink.

Detsky Razvlekatelny Park
Detsky Razvlekatelny Park is a children's amusement park located near Downtown Vladivostok.  The park contains a carousel, gaming machines, a Ferris wheel, cafés, an aquarium, movie theater and a stadium.

Admiralsky Skver
Admiralsky Skver is a landmark located near Downtown Vladivostok.  The Square is an open space, dominated by the Triumfalnaya Arka. South of the square sits a museum of Soviet submarine S-56.

Sports

Vladivostok is home to the soccer club FC Luch-Energiya Vladivostok, which plays in the Russian First Division, ice hockey club Admiral Vladivostok from the Kontinental Hockey League's Chernyshev Division, and basketball club Spartak Primorye, of the Russian Basketball Super League. It is also home to the Vostok Vladivostok motorcycle speedway club.

Vladivostok annually hosts various contests. In 2022, the 35th Regatta boat for the Goblet of Peter the Great and the 19th Russian Championship of Conrad-25R yachts were held.

Pollution
Local ecologists from the Ecocenter organization have claimed that much of Vladivostok's suburbs are polluted and that living in them can be classified as a health hazard. The pollution has a number of causes, according to Ecocenter geochemical expert Sergey Shlykov. Vladivostok has about eighty industrial sites, which may not be many compared to Russia's most industrialized areas, but those around the city are particularly environmentally unfriendly, such as shipbuilding and repairing, power stations, printing, fur farming, and mining.

In addition, Vladivostok has particularly vulnerable geography which compounds the effect of pollution. Winds cannot clear pollution from some of the most densely populated areas around the Pervaya and Vtoraya Rechka as they sit in basins which the winds blow over. In addition, there is little snow in winter and no leaves or grass to catch the dust to make it settle down.

Twin towns – sister cities

Vladivostok is twinned with:

 Akita, Japan
 Busan, South Korea
 Dalian, China
 Hakodate, Japan
 Harbin, China
 Ho Chi Minh City, Vietnam
 Incheon, South Korea
 Juneau, United States
 Kota Kinabalu, Malaysia
 Manta, Ecuador
 Niigata, Japan
 Pohang, South Korea
 San Diego, United States
 Tacoma, United States
  Tskhinvali, South Ossetia
 Vladikavkaz, Russia
 Wonsan, North Korea
 Yanbian, China

In 2010, arches with the names of each of Vladivostok's twin towns were placed in a park within the city.

From Vladivostok ferry port next to the train station, a ferry of the DBS Cruise Ferry travels regularly to Donghae, South Korea and from there to Sakaiminato on the Japanese main island of Honshu.

Notable people

 Alexandra Biriukova (1895–1967), architect
 Alexei Volkonski (born 1978), canoeist
 Anna Shchetinina (1908–1999), captain
 Elmar Lohk (1901–1963), architect
 Eugene Kozlovsky (born 1946), writer
 Feliks Gromov (1937–), admiral
 Igor Ansoff (1918–2002), mathematician
 Igor Kunitsyn (born 1981), tennis player
 Igor Tamm (1895–1971), physicist
 Ilya Lagutenko (born 1968), singer
 Ivan Vasiliev (born 1989), ballet dancer
 Kristina Rihanoff (born 1977), dancer
 Ksenia Kahnovich (born 1987), model
 Lev Knyazev (1924–2012), writer
 Liah Greenfeld (born 1954), academic
 Lilia Akhaimova (born 1997), gymnast 
 Mary Losseff (1907–1972), singer, film actor
 Mikhail Koklyaev (born 1978), strongman
 Natalia Pogonina (born 1985), chess player
 Nikolay Dubinin (1907–1998), biologist
 Paul Portnyagin (1903–1977), Greek-Catholic priest, teacher and orientalist
 Peter A. Boodberg (1903–1972), scholar, linguist
 Stanislav Petrov (1939–2017), soldier, averted nuclear war
 Svoy (born 1980), musician
 Swathi Reddy (born 1987), Indian actress 
 Victor Zotov (1908–1977), botanist
 Vitali Kravtsov (born 1999), ice hockey forward
 Vladimir Arsenyev (1872–1930), explorer
 Vladimir Ossipoff (1907–1998), architect
 Wes Hurley (born 1981), filmmaker
 Yi Dong-hwi (1873–1935), Korean communist
 Yul Brynner (1920–1985), film actor

See also
32nd Rifle Division (Soviet Union)
List of North Asian ports

Notes

References

Faulstich, Edith. M. "The Siberian Sojourn" Yonkers, N.Y. (1972–1977)

Poznyak, Tatyana Z. 2004. Foreign Citizens in the Cities of the Russian Far East (the second half of the 19th and 20th centuries). Vladivostok: Dalnauka, 2004. 316 p..
Stephan, John. 1994. The Far East a History. Stanford: Stanford University Press, 1994. 481 p.
Trofimov, Vladimir et al., 1992, Old Vladivostok. Utro Rossii Vladivostok,

External links

Official website of Vladivostok  
Historical Map of Vladivostok (1912), Perry–Castañeda Library Map Collection, University of Texas, Austin.
 

 
Cities and towns in Primorsky Krai
Ports and harbours of the Russian Pacific Coast
Port cities and towns in Russia
Populated coastal places in Russia
Manchuria
Russian Far East
Pacific Coast of Russia
Russian and Soviet Navy bases
Populated places established in 1860
1860 establishments in Asia
1860 establishments in the Russian Empire